Derek Addison (born 8 July 1955 in Dundee) is a Scottish former footballer who played as a midfielder.

A former pupil of Harris Academy, Addison was briefly attached to Hibernian aged 16 before returning to his native Tayside. After a season playing with Junior side Lochee United he signed for Jim McLean's Dundee United. Considered part of the club's move towards home-grown players, he broke into the first team at the same time as John Holt and Ray Stewart and Billy Kirkwood. However, he was unable to establish himself as a regular in the side: in his eight seasons at Tannadice he only once made more than twenty league starts.

Addison signed for recently relegated Hearts in September 1981, along with former international striker Willie Pettigrew, in a deal worth almost £200,000.
Although he enjoyed a prominent first team role for the first time, the size of his transfer fee coupled with a failure to gain instant promotion had led to financial problems at Hearts, necessitating his sale after only one season. Fellow First Division side St Johnstone paid £65,000 for his services in 1982 and he made 113 competitive appearances for the Perth side in 4 seasons. He attained a player-coach role with the Saints in 1985 but left the club a year later.

References

External links
Appearances at londonhearts.com

1955 births
Association football midfielders
Brechin City F.C. players
Dundee United F.C. players
Heart of Midlothian F.C. players
Hibernian F.C. players
Living people
Lochee United F.C. players
Scottish Football League players
Scottish footballers
Scottish Junior Football Association players
Footballers from Dundee
St Johnstone F.C. players
People educated at Harris Academy